Gleierbach (also: Gleiderbach, in its upper and middle course also Westernah or Westernahbach) is a river of North Rhine-Westphalia, Germany. It flows through the municipality Schmallenberg. It is a right tributary of the Lenne, which it joins in Gleidorf, east of Schmallenberg.

See also
List of rivers of North Rhine-Westphalia

References

Rivers of North Rhine-Westphalia
Rivers of Germany